Estradiol benzoate/progesterone (EB/P4), sold under the brand names Duogynon and Sistocyclin among others, is a combination medication of estradiol benzoate (EB), an estrogen, and progesterone (P4), a progestogen. It has been formulated both as short-acting oil solutions and long-acting microcrystalline aqueous suspensions and is given by injection into muscle either once or continuously at regular intervals.

EB/P4 was one of the first combined estrogen and progestogen medications to be introduced for medical use. It was first marketed in Germany as an oil solution in 1950. Microcrystalline EB/P4 in aqueous suspension was developed and marketed under the brand name Sistocyclin several years later. EB/P4 was eventually superseded by longer-acting parenteral estrogen–progestogen combinations as well as by oral estrogen–progestogen combinations.

Medical uses
EB/P4 has been used to treat menstrual disorders such as secondary amenorrhea and menstrual irregularity, as a form of emergency contraception within 48 hours of sexual intercourse, and as a test for pregnancy. In the form of a microcrystalline aqueous suspension, EB/P4 has particularly been used to treat functional uterine bleeding.

EB/P4 has been studied in the treatment of breast cancer in women and found to be effective.

Available forms
EB/P4 is or has been available for use by intramuscular injection both in the form of short-acting oil solutions (e.g., Duogynon, Lutrogen) and long-acting microcrystalline aqueous suspensions (e.g., Clinomin Forte, Sistocyclin).
 These are provided as ampoules, with the oil-solution ampoules containing 2–3 mg EB and 12.5–50 mg progesterone and the aqueous-suspension ampoules containing 10 mg EB and 200 mg progesterone. The crystal sizes in microcrystalline EB/P4 in aqueous suspension (Sistocyclin) are 0.01 to 0.02 mm for EB crystals and 0.02 to 0.1 mm for P4 crystals. An oil-solution ampoule containing 30 mg EB and 30 mg P4 (brand name Vermagest) is used as an injectable emergency contraceptive. Clinomin Forte is an aqueous suspension of EB/P4 that additionally contains lidocaine and remains available today.

Side effects

Pharmacology

Pharmacodynamics
EB is an estrogen, or an agonist of the estrogen receptors, the biological target of estrogens like endogenous estradiol. It is an estradiol ester and prodrug of estradiol with a longer duration of action than estradiol when administered by intramuscular injection in oil solution or aqueous suspension. P4 is a progestogen, or an agonist of the progesterone receptors, the biological target of progestogens like endogenous progesterone.

The full endometrial transformation dosage of EB/P4 in oil solution is 1 to 2 mg EB and 20 to 25 mg P4 by intramuscular injection daily for 10 to 14 days, whereas the full endometrial transformation dosage of EB/P4 in microcrystalline aqueous suspension is a single intramuscular injection of 10 mg EB and 200 mg P4. For comparison, the full endometrial transformation dosage of estradiol valerate and hydroxyprogesterone caproate in oil solution (brand name Gravibinon) is a single intramuscular injection of 10 mg estradiol valerate and 250 to 375 mg hydroxyprogesterone caproate. Endometrial transformation normally occurs during the luteal phase of the menstrual cycle; it is induced by endogenous progesterone following adequate priming by endogenous estradiol.

The decidua (pregnancy-type endometrium) induction dosage of EB/P4 in oil solution is 2 to 5 mg EB and 20 to 100 mg P4 by intramuscular injection daily for 5 to 7 weeks, whereas the decidua induction dosage of EB/P4 in microcrystalline aqueous suspension is 10 to 20 mg EB and 200 to 250 mg P4 in microcrystalline aqueous suspension by intramuscular injection once per week for about 6 weeks. For comparison, the decidua induction dosage of estradiol valerate and hydroxyprogesterone caproate in oil solution is about the same as that of microcrystalline EB/P4 in aqueous suspension. The decidua induction dosages of estrogen and progestogen combinations are pseudopregnancy dosages.

Pharmacokinetics
EB/P4 is administered by intramuscular injection a single time or continuously at regular intervals, depending on the indication. Amorphous EB/P4 in oil solution (e.g., Duogynon, Lutrogen) is reported to have a duration of action of 2 days in terms of the progestogen component, and hence is a short-acting preparation, whereas microcrystalline EB/P4 in aqueous suspension (e.g., Sistocyclin) has a duration of 10 to 12 days, and hence is a long-acting preparation. A study found that a single intramuscular injection of 10 mg microcrystalline EB in aqueous suspension with a 0.05 mm crystal size (similar to that in Sistocyclin) resulted in a maximal 7-fold increase in estradiol excretion on the 2nd day after injection and maintained elevated estradiol excretion for 17 days.

History
EB/P4 in oil solution for use by intramuscular injection was first marketed in Germany in 1950. It was one of the first combined estrogen and progestogen medications to be introduced for medical use. To achieve a longer duration of action, microcrystalline EB/P4 with defined crystal sizes in aqueous suspension was developed, studied in 1954, and marketed under the brand name Sistocyclin shortly thereafter in the 1950s. Formulations containing a combination of EB or estradiol valerate (an estradiol ester with a longer duration than EB) and the longer-acting synthetic progestogen hydroxyprogesterone caproate in oil solution (brand names Primosiston, Gravibinon) were introduced in 1955 and eventually superseded EB/P4. Oral estrogen–progestogen combinations, such as mestranol/noretynodrel (brand name Enovid), were also introduced in the 1950s, and soon replaced EB/P4 for menstrual and other indications as well.

Society and culture

Brand names
EB/P4 has been marketed under a large number of brand names including Component E-C, Component E-S, Di Pro Oleosum, Duogynon, Duogynon ampule, Duogynon forte, Duogynon simplex, Duoton Fort T P, Emmenovis, Estroprogyn, Gestrygen, Implus-C, Implus S, Jephagynon, Klimovan, Limovanil, Lutofolone, Menovis, Menstrogen Forte, Mestrolar, Metrigen Fuerte, Nomestrol, Phenokinon-F, Pro-Estramon-S, Prodiol, Proger F, Progestediol, Sistocyclin, Synovex C, Synovex S, and Tonevex S.

Availability
EB/P4 was originally developed and marketed in Europe. Today, it is available in a number of places in the world including various Latin American countries, Egypt, Italy, Lebanon, Taiwan, Thailand, Turkey, Malaysia, and Ethiopia. EB/P4 is available specifically as an injectable emergency contraceptive in El Salvador, Honduras, and Nicaragua.

EB/P4 in oil solution remains widely available throughout the world. Conversely, Sistocyclin, or microcrystalline EB/P4 in aqueous suspension, is no longer marketed. However, individual formulations of microcrystalline EB in aqueous suspension (brand name Agofollin Depot) and microcrystalline P4 in aqueous suspension (brand name Agolutin Depot) remain available in some countries, including the Czech Republic and Slovakia.

Veterinary uses
EB/P4 is used in veterinary medicine under the brand names Component E-C, Component E-S, Synovex C, and Synovex S, among others.

See also
 List of combined sex-hormonal preparations § Estrogens and progestogens
 List of sex-hormonal aqueous suspensions

References

Combined estrogen–progestogen formulations
Combined injectable contraceptives